Barzabil (also Romanized as Barzābīl; also known as Barzabul) is a village in Howmeh Rural District, in the Central District of Abhar County, Zanjan Province, Iran. At the 2006 census, its population was 22, in 8 families.

References 

Populated places in Abhar County